Athol, also known as Benbury Hall and Joshua Skinner House, is a historic plantation house located near Edenton, Chowan County, North Carolina. It was built about 1857, and is a -story, five bay, "T"-shaped Greek Revival style frame dwelling.  The rear section of the house features two-tier porches on either side.  The front facade features a full-length two-tiered porch supported by Roman Ionic order columns.

It was listed on the National Register of Historic Places in 1980.

See also

References

External links

Historic American Buildings Survey in North Carolina
Plantation houses in North Carolina
Houses on the National Register of Historic Places in North Carolina
Greek Revival houses in North Carolina
Houses completed in 1845
Houses in Chowan County, North Carolina
National Register of Historic Places in Chowan County, North Carolina